Parul Quitola Shah is an Indian-Filipino model and beauty pageant titleholder who was crowned Binibining Pilipinas Tourism 2014 at the Binibining Pilipinas 2014. In 2015, she was appointed as Binibining Pilipinas Grand International 2015.

Pageantry
She competed at the Binibining Pilipinas 2013 pageant and was chosen as one of the 15 semi-finalists. She decided to once again compete in Binibining Pilipinas and entered the 2014 edition on 30 March 2014, where she was crowned Binibining Pilipinas Tourism 2014 by the outgoing titleholder Binibining Pilipinas Tourism 2013, Joanna Cindy Miranda. However she could not compete in the said pageant as the pageant never happened. Parul Shah was handpicked to represent the Philippines at Miss Grand International 2015, where she placed 3rd Runner-up.

Shah represented the Mountain Province during the Turismo Pilipina 2008 pageant.

Post Pageantry
In 2016, Shah won the fifth season of The Amazing Race Asia with Maggie Wilson.

References

Binibining Pilipinas winners
Filipino female models
Filipino people of Indian descent
Living people
People from Pangasinan
Star Magic
Year of birth missing (living people)
Filipino Hindus
The Amazing Race contestants
Reality show winners
Miss Grand International contestants

University of the Cordilleras alumni